Pittsburgh Railways was one of the predecessors of Pittsburgh Regional Transit. It had 666 PCC cars, the third largest fleet in North America (after Toronto (745) and Chicago (683)).  It had 68 streetcar routes, of which only three (until April 5, 2010, the 42 series, the 47 series, and 52) are used by the Port Authority as light rail routes.  With the Port Authority's Transit Development Plan, many route names will be changed to its original, such as the 41D Brookline becoming the 39 Brookline. Many of the streetcar routes have been remembered in the route names of many Port Authority buses (e.g. 71 series).

History 

1895 to 1905 was a time of consolidation for the numerous street railways serving Pittsburgh. On July 24, 1895 the Consolidated Traction Company (CTC) was chartered and the following year acquired the Central Traction Company, Citizens Traction Company, Duquesne Traction Company and Pittsburgh Traction Company and converted them to electric operation. On July 27, 1896 the United Traction Company (UTC) was chartered and absorbed the Second Avenue Traction Company, which had been running electric cars since 1890.

The Southern Traction Company (STC) acquired the lease of the West End Traction Company on October 1, 1900. Pittsburgh Railway Company (PRC) was formed on January 1, 1902, when STC acquired operating rights over CTC and UTC.

The lease and operate business model proved hard to support and the company declared bankruptcy twice, first in 1918 lasting for 6 years and then again in 1938, this time lasting until January 1, 1951. Company costs rose in the early twentieth century. PRC faced constant pressure from the city to improve equipment and services. Workers walked out when a pay raise was rejected.

On July 26, 1936, PRC took delivery of PCC streetcar No. 100 from the St. Louis Car Company. It was placed in revenue service in August 1936, the first revenue earning PCC in the world.

Large scale abandonments of lines began in the late 1950s, usually associated with highway or bridge work.

Duquesne-McKeesport

Highway improvements in the Duquesne-McKeesport area resulted in the replacement of trolley services with buses on September 21, 1958.

West End lines

The replacement of the Point Bridge with the Fort Pitt Bridge precipitated the abandonment of many routes to the West End, all on June 21, 1959. PRC was engaged in ongoing litigation over the failure of the Pennsylvania Public Utilities Commission to provide streetcar tracks on the new bridge. In the end the company was allowed to abandon  of street track in situ and was awarded $300,000 as compensation. The litigation marked the beginning of significant abandonments: 90 percent of the network was dismantled over the next decade.

Interurban

PRC Interurban Division ran an interurban trolley system linking Pittsburgh with towns in Washington County such as Washington, Charleroi and Roscoe.

Charleroi
The origins of the Charleroi interurban line began in 1895 in Monongahela City, with the construction of a small street railway by the Monongahela City Street Railway Company. In 1900 the line was extended north to Riverview and in 1901 extended south to Black Diamond Mine. Here it turned inland, south along Black Dam Hollow (the former roadbed is now known as Trolley Lane). It met the northern end of the newly constructed (1899) Charleroi & West Side Street Railway at the now-disused Lock number 4 in North Charleroi.

The Charleroi interurban line was cut back to the Allegheny County border at Library (Simmons loop) in June 1953 It continued to operate until the 1980s as 35 Shannon-Library and became the southern portion of 47L Library via Overbrook when Light Rail Vehicles (LRVs) replaced trolleys. The trolley loop was removed in 2004. In 2010 this line became the Blue Line – Library, and in 2020 was renamed the Silver Line - Library.

Washington
The Washington line was cut back to the county boundary at Drake in August 1953 and eventually became the 36 Shannon-Drake.
This in turn became the southern portion of 42 South Hills Village (excluding the new link from Dorchester to South Hills Village, which was built in 1984). The final portion of the interurban from Dorchester to Drake was renamed 47 Drake, finally closing in 1999 and bringing to an end PCC Streetcar operation in Pittsburgh.

Diversification
The company acquired G. Barr & Co., a manufacturer of aerosol cans, in 1962, and bought Alarm Device Manufacturing Company (Ademco) in 1963. It received $16.558 million for the sale of the streetcar system to the Port Authority in 1964. In 1967, it was renamed to Pittway Corporation. Later, Pittway became best known as a manufacturer and distributor of professional fire and burglar alarms and other security systems.  On February 3, 2000, Pittway was acquired by Honeywell.

Rolling stock

Early types

Double deck cars were used by PRC between 1913 and 1924, a rarity for such cars in the U.S. Conventional single-deck stock formed the majority of the fleet.

PCC types
PRC operated 666 PCCs on 68 routes; the second-largest fleet of new cars (after Chicago), starting with number 100, the first PCC to enter revenue service. The company took delivery of car 1600 in 1945, which was the prototype for the over 1,800 post-War “all-electric” PCCs built in North America. Cars 1700–1724, which were delivered in 1948, were equipped with special features for use on the interurban lines to Washington and Charleroi. These included B-3 trucks and a roof-mounted sealed-beam headlight. (Cars 1615–19 and 1644–48 were similarly modified in 1948.)

In 1950 the 100 was converted to instruction car M-11. Because replacement parts were no longer available, cars 1784 (originally 1603, and subsequently renumbered 1976) and 1779 were rebuilt in 1976 and 1977 respectively, with LRV-style flat fronts. In 1981 PATransit constructed cars 4000–4013 on new frames that utilized a mix of new parts and components salvaged from retired 1700-series cars. The last four PCCs were finally retired on September 4, 1999, having been replaced by Siemens SD-400 Light Rail Vehicles.

Preservation
A number of Pittsburgh streetcars have been preserved.

Routes

Pittsburgh Railways operated 68 streetcar routes.

A notable, unnumbered, tripper (unscheduled extra) service was signed Stadium-Forbes Field, for Pitt Panthers and Pittsburgh Steelers football games and Pirates baseball games. Pitt Stadium and Forbes Field were convenient to the lines on Fifth Avenue and Forbes Avenue, both two-way streets during the trolley era. This service, which probably last ran in fall 1966, was no longer possible after the East End lines closed in January 1967.

The Interurban lines did not use route numbers. Outbound interurban cars were signed for their outbound destination, namely Charleroi, Roscoe or Washington; some PCC rollsigns instead prefixed Shannon- to the destination, e.g. Shannon-Washington. Inbound cars were signed simply Pittsburgh.

Car barns 

Pittsburgh Railways inherited many different car barns from the companies that formed it, many of which were closed during the final years prior to take over by the Port Authority. At the time of the PA takeover on February 28, 1964, only Craft Avenue, Keating and Tunnel (South Hills) remained as streetcar facilities, together with Homewood Shops, and a former carbarn in Rankin used only for dead storage of retired cars.

Craft Avenue
A large (16 track) facility with several administration buildings at Craft Avenue and Forbes Avenue in Oakland. It served routes 50, 64, 66, 67, 68, 69, 75 and 81. Craft Avenue assumed storage duties for East End facilities that were closed such as Homewood, Herron Hill and Highland Park, as well as Carrick on the South Side; thus it eventually also served routes such as 22, 71, 73, 76, 77/54, 87 and 88. Craft Avenue ceased to be a streetcar facility on January 28, 1967 when all East End lines were converted to bus. The site is now occupied by the Magee-Womens Hospital of the University of Pittsburgh Medical Center.

Glenwood
Glenwood Car Barn served the  55, 56, 57, 58, 65 and 98 routes and housed approximately 54 cars.

Homewood
Homewood car barn was begun in 1900 and grew to be one of the two largest installations of Pittsburgh Railways, with 110 cars housed there. Also the site of PRC's heavy repair shops, it covered four blocks from 7100 to 7400 on the south side of Frankstown Avenue, bordered by North Lang Avenue to the west, Felicia Way to the south and Braddock to the east. On May 18, 1955 Barn No. 2 was destroyed by fire along with all of the equipment within it, which included PCC trolleys 1026, 1051, 1155, 1220, 1281, 1294,1600,1648, 1682,1701,1725. Homewood car barn closed in 1960, though the shops remained in use until January 1967 when all East End lines were closed. The large site is now used for a mixture of residential and commercial premises, with the last remaining railway buildings converted first to a skating rink and then in 1997 to a bowling alley and entertainment venue called the Homewood Coliseum. Since 2000 the complex has also housed The Trolley Station Oral History Center.

Ingram 
Ingram carbarn was the main storage facility in the West End. Located on Berry Street in Ingram Borough on routes 30 and 31, it also served routes 23, 25, 26, 27, 28, 29 and 34. It consisted of a 4-road brick shed housing 20 cars, an 8-road open yard capable of holding about 120 cars,  and a brick administration building. Ingram ceased as an active facility after June 21, 1959 when all the West End lines were abandoned after the Point Bridge was closed to traffic, although 30 1000- and 1100-series PCCs made surplus by the conversion were scrapped there. The property was sold to the Roman Catholic Diocese of Pittsburgh; the barn proper was converted in 1968 to the Church of the Ascension, while the yard office was converted to classrooms, parish offices and a parish hall.

Keating
Keating car house was built in 1921. It served routes 7, 8, 9, 10, 11, 12, 15 and 21. The remaining trolley routes from Manchester car house (6, 13, 14, 18 and 19) were moved to Keating in 1959. The final North Side trolleys (6/14 and 21) were transferred to South Hills Car House in 1965 and the facility became the bus-only Ross Garage.

Millvale
Millvale car barn was built on the site of the Graff, Bennett Mill which burnt down in 1900. It catered for services 1, 2, 3, 4 and 5.

Plummer Street
The car barn at 48th and Plummer Street in Lawrenceville served the 94 Aspinwall, 95 Butler Street, and 96 East Liberty via Morningside services. It replaced the Butler Street Cable and Horse car barn at 47th and Butler. It was closed in the summer of 1954, with services 94 Aspinwall and 95 Butler Street routes being assigned to Manchester Car House until June 1959. They then transferred to Keating Car House until replaced by bus routes on November 13, 1960. Service 96 East Liberty was transferred first to Bunker Hill car barn then Homewood Car House until June, 1960. It was then transferred to Craft Avenue car house, also being replaced by buses on November 13, 1960 when the 62nd St. Sharpsburg Bridge was closed.

Tunnel 

The Tunnel (also referred to as South Hills) car barn, located along Curtis and Jasper Streets next to South Hills Junction and the south portal of the South Hills Tunnel, was the car storage facility for many, and eventually all, South Side lines, and one of the most important such facilities on the entire system. It consisted of a 4-road brick shed with administrative offices, plus a 6-road outdoor yard. While containing fewer tracks than yards like Craft Avenue, the length of the tracks allowed storage of many more cars per road, especially outdoors. Tunnel served lines 23, 35, 36, 37, 38, 39, 40, 42 and 43 (later the 42/38), 44, 46 (later 49), 48, and later the 47 and 53 lines to Carrick, and the final North Side lines 6/14 and 21. It also shared storage duties for the two Interurban lines with the barns in Charleroi and in Tylerdale (Washington). As the nucleus of the surviving PAT trolley lines, Tunnel barn survived into the mid-1980s, when it was demolished after being replaced by the current PAT storage and maintenance facility at the end of the South Hills Village branch off the Drake line.

West Park
The West Park car barn in McKees Rocks was a large facility with two barns and several outdoor sidings. It was bounded by Third Street to the north, Chartiers Avenue to the south and Rox Street to the east. It closed in 1931, but remained a storage facility for scrap trolley parts. The building was demolished in 1951. 5 Generation Bakers now occupies the southern part of the site with a bakery and a retail outlet in a former supermarket building, with new housing to the north.

Gallery

See also 

 Pittsburgh Light Rail - modern successor to the streetcar system
 West Penn Railways - connecting interurban system to the southeast

References

External links 
Pittsburgh Railways Company
Charleroi Interurban
Finding aid to the Pittsburgh Railways Company Records at the Archives Service Center, University of Pittsburgh
Photographs from the Pittsburgh Railways Company Collection
 Pittsburgh Transit History

Defunct Pennsylvania railroads
Defunct public transport operators in the United States
Railway companies established in 1902
Port Authority of Allegheny County
Streetcars in Pennsylvania
5 ft 2½ in gauge railways in the United States
Interurban railways in Pennsylvania
Transportation in Pittsburgh